The Rural Municipality of Foam Lake No. 276 is a rural municipality (RM) in the Canadian province of Saskatchewan within Census Division No. 10 and  Division No. 4. It is located in the east-central portion of the province.

History 
The RM of Foam Lake No. 306 incorporated as a rural municipality on December 12, 1910. It was renumbered when it amalgamated with the RM of Beaver No. 276 on December 31, 1952. The RM had the second highest population density in 1955 for the province.

Geography

Communities and localities 
The following urban municipalities are surrounded by the RM.

Towns
 Foam Lake
Resort villages
Chorney Beach
Leslie Beach

The following unincorporated communities are within the RM.

Organized hamlets
 Tuffnell

Localities
 Edmore
 Goudie
 Kristnes
 Layco
 West Bend, (dissolved as a village)
 Winthorpe

Demographics 

Government 
The RM of Foam Lake No. 276 is governed by an elected municipal council and an appointed administrator that meets on the second Wednesday of every month. The reeve of the RM is Ken Kaban while its administrator is Shanna Loeppky. The RM's office is located in Foam Lake.

References 

F

Icelandic settlements in Saskatchewan
Division No. 10, Saskatchewan